Robert Nicholas Burns (born January 28, 1956) is an American diplomat and academic who serves as the United States ambassador to China since 2022. 

Burns has had a 25 year career in the State Department, and served as United States Under Secretary of State for Political Affairs. Appointed by President George W. Bush, he was confirmed by the U.S. Senate on March 17, 2005, and was sworn into office by Secretary of State Condoleezza Rice. As under secretary, he oversaw the bureaus responsible for U.S. policy in each region of the world and served in the senior career Foreign Service position at the Department. He retired on April 30, 2008. He was a visiting scholar at the Woodrow Wilson Center in Washington, D.C., in summer 2008. In July 2009, Burns joined The Cohen Group, a consulting firm in Washington, D.C, as a senior counselor.

Burns is a professor of diplomacy and international politics at the John F. Kennedy School of Government at Harvard University and a member of the Board of Directors of the school's Belfer Center for Science and International Affairs. He is director of the Aspen Strategy Group, senior counselor at The Cohen Group, and serves on the board of directors of Entegris, Inc. He writes a bi-weekly column on foreign affairs for The Boston Globe and is a senior foreign affairs columnist for GlobalPost. He also serves on the board of directors of the Atlantic Council, the Council on Foreign Relations, Special Olympics, the Rockefeller Brothers Fund, the Appeal of Conscience Foundation, the Center for the Study of the Presidency and Congress, American Media Abroad, the Gennadius Library and the Richard Lounsbery Foundation. Burns is vice chairman of the American Ditchley Foundation and serves on the panel of senior advisors at Chatham House. 

President Joe Biden nominated Burns to be Ambassador to China in August 2021. He was confirmed by the entire Senate on December 16, 2021, by a vote of 75–18. He presented his credentials on April 1, 2022.

Early life and education
Burns was born in Buffalo, New York, and raised in Wellesley, Massachusetts. Burns attended Wellesley High School, and studied abroad in Luxembourg in 1973 with the American Field Service Program. He earned a Bachelor of Arts degree in history, with a concentration in European history, from Boston College. He also studied abroad at the University of Paris. He received a master's degree from Johns Hopkins School of Advanced International Studies in 1980 in international relations concentrating on international economics, American foreign policy, and Africa.

He speaks French, Arabic, and Greek as well as English.

Career

U.S. Foreign Service

Before entering the Foreign Service, Burns worked as program officer at A.T. International, a nonprofit organization specializing in economic assistance for Third World countries.

Burns began his Foreign Service career in Africa and the Middle East. He was an intern at the U.S. Embassy in Nouakchott, Mauritania, Vice Consul and Staff Assistant to the Ambassador in Cairo, Egypt, from 1983 to 1985, and then political officer at the American Consulate General in Jerusalem from 1985 to 1987, where his second daughter Elizabeth was born in 1986. In this position, he coordinated U.S. economic assistance to the Palestinian population in the West Bank, including East Jerusalem.

Under President George H. W. Bush, he was director for Soviet (and then Russian after 1991) affairs. During this time, he attended all U.S.–Soviet summits and numerous other international meetings and specialized on economic assistance issues, U.S. ties with Russia and Ukraine, and relations with the Baltic countries. He was a member of the Department's Transition Team in 1988, and served as Staff Officer in the Department's Operations Center and Secretariat in 1987-1988.

Burns served for five years (1990–1995) on the National Security Council staff at the White House. He was special assistant to President Bill Clinton and Senior Director for Russia, Ukraine, and Eurasia Affairs. He had lead responsibility in the White House for advising the president on all aspects of U.S. relations with the fifteen countries of the former Soviet Union.

From 1995 to 1997, Burns was Spokesman of the Department of State and Acting Assistant Secretary for Public Affairs for Secretary of State Warren Christopher and Secretary Madeleine Albright. In this position, he gave daily press conferences on U.S. foreign policy issues, accompanied both Secretaries of State on all their foreign trips and coordinated all of the Department's public outreach programs.

From 1997 to 2001, Burns was the United States Ambassador to Greece. During his tenure as Ambassador, the U.S. expanded its military and law enforcement cooperation with Greece, strengthened their partnership in the Balkans, increased trade and investment and people-to-people programs.

Burns supported the 2003 invasion of Iraq. Prior to his final assignment, Burns was the United States Permanent Representative to the North Atlantic Treaty Organization. As Ambassador to NATO, he headed the combined State-Defense Department U.S. Mission to NATO at a time when the Alliance committed to new missions in Iraq, Afghanistan and the global war against terrorism, and accepted seven new members.

On January 18, 2008, Burns announced his retirement from the Foreign Service effective March 2008. The reason cited was to go back to family concerns and to pursue other opportunities outside of government. A White House press statement stated that Burns would continue to serve in an advisory capacity as the United States Special Envoy in finalizing the United States-India Peaceful Atomic Energy Cooperation Act.

Private service
After leaving government service Burns started working for the Cohen Group, a consultancy and lobbying organization for arms manufacturers.

At the Harvard Kennedy School, Burns has taught courses in diplomacy, American foreign policy, and international politics. He is a strong advocate for diplomacy, and has argued that the United States "should make a very strong effort to get to the negotiating table with Iran". Burns is also an active speaker on the lecture circuit and in 2013 gave the lecture at the year's installment of the Waldo Family Lecture Series on International Relations at Old Dominion University.

Burns said that NSA whistleblower Edward Snowden is a traitor: "He went to China and Russia. That is why I dislike Snowden". On the 2012 Benghazi attack, Burns defended Secretary of State Clinton, saying "I find it distasteful that Benghazi has been politicized." He endorsed Hillary Clinton's campaign for president.

Burns was a foreign policy adviser for the Joe Biden 2020 presidential campaign, and was an informal adviser to Hillary Clinton 2016 presidential campaign. As a Bush advisor Burns supported the Iraq War, though today he calls it “a pretty serious blunder.” He is also the director of the Aspen Strategy Group, a forum of establishment foreign policy thinkers.

Burns has also consulted and given paid speeches for the employees of Goldman Sachs, Bank of America, State Street, CitiBank, Honeywell, and a number of other companies, universities, and associations.

Ambassador to China 

In August 2021, Burns was nominated by the Biden Administration to serve as Ambassador to China. The Senate Foreign Relations Committee held hearings on his nomination on October 20, 2021. The committee favorably reported his nomination to the Senate floor on November 3, 2021. Republican Senator Marco Rubio had stalled Burns' nomination, citing his business relationships in China. Burns was confirmed by the Senate on December 16, 2021, by a vote of 75–18. He presented his credentials to Chinese Foreign Minister Wang Yi on April 1, 2022. Unlike other nations, China's head of state, Xi Jinping, does not receive the credentials of foreign ambassadors.

Personal life 
Burns speaks fluent French and is proficient in Arabic and Greek. He and his wife have three daughters.

Memberships
Burns is a member of the Council on Foreign Relations, The Trilateral Commission, American Academy of Diplomacy, The American Academy of Arts and Sciences, Order of St. John, America Abroad Media advisory board, and is a lifelong member of Red Sox Nation.

Awards
Fifteen honorary degrees
Presidential Distinguished Service Award
Secretary of State’s Distinguished Service Award
2017 Ignatian Award from Boston College
2016 New Englander of the Year from the New England Council
Woodrow Wilson Award for Public Service from the Johns Hopkins University
Boston College Alumni Achievement Award
Jean Mayer Global Citizenship Award from Tufts University
Trainor Award for Diplomacy by Georgetown University
Communicator of the Year by the National Association of Government Communicators in 1997.

References

External links

Nicholas Burns bio at Harvard Kennedy School's Belfer Center
US diplomat calls for Iran action
'Victorious' Kazakhs Told To Wait On OSCE Decision

|-

|-

|-

1956 births
Advisors to Chatham House
Ambassadors of the United States to China
Ambassadors of the United States to Greece
Atlantic Council 
Morrissey College of Arts & Sciences alumni
Center for a New American Security
Fellows of the American Academy of Arts and Sciences
Harvard Kennedy School faculty
Living people
Paul H. Nitze School of Advanced International Studies alumni
Permanent Representatives of the United States to NATO
Recipients of the Order of the Cross of Terra Mariana, 2nd Class
Under Secretaries of State for Political Affairs
United States Department of State spokespeople
United States Foreign Service personnel
University of Paris alumni
Wellesley High School alumni
American expatriates in France